Mohamed Ghanem Salman (Arabic:محمد غانم سلمان) (born 4 May 1984) in Bidoon Kuwait is a Qatari footballer who plays as a goalkeeper.

He is the brother of the Qatari international player Saoud Ghanem .

Career

Al-Arabi
Mohamed Ghanem was born in Kuwait and he is a Bidoon, started his career at Al-Arabi and is a product of the Arabi's youth system, and he played with them until 2013 .

Mesaimeer
On 15 September 2015, he obtained the Qatari passport and signed with Mesaimeer . On 6 March 2016, Mohamed Ghanem made his professional debut for Mesaimeer against El Jaish in the Pro League .

Qatar SC
On 5 July 2019, he left Mesaimeer and signed with Qatar on loan of the season.

External links

References

Living people
1984 births
Qatari footballers
Qatari people of Kuwaiti descent
Naturalised citizens of Qatar
Kuwaiti emigrants to Qatar
Al-Arabi SC (Kuwait) players
Mesaimeer SC players
Qatar SC players
Kuwait Premier League players
Qatar Stars League players
Qatari Second Division players
Association football goalkeepers
Place of birth missing (living people)